Yoel Aloni  (September 30, 1937 – September 9, 2019) was an Israeli chess master and problemist. He was the twin brother of Hillel Aloni (1937-2017).

He played twice for Israel in Chess Olympiads.
 In 1964, at fourth board in 16th Chess Olympiad in Tel Aviv (+4 –6 =4);
 In 1966, at first reserve board in 17th Chess Olympiad in Havana (+8 –1 =2).

He took 4th in Israel Chess Solving Championship at Tel Aviv 2005 (Ram Soffer won). He took 53rd in the 29th World Chess Solving Championship at Eretria in 2005 (Piotr Murdzia won).

References

1937 births
2019 deaths
Israeli Jews
Israeli chess players
Jewish chess players
Chess composers